Stan Jones (born 16 November 1938 in Oxford) is an English former football defender. After starting in non-league football with Kidderminster Harriers, he played in the Football League for Walsall (two spells) and West Bromwich Albion.

Jones played youth football for Staffordshire where he was spotted by Kidderminster Harriers. After making his name at the club he was briefly associated with Wolverhampton Wanderers as an amateur before signing for Walsall in 1956. A tall, burly defender noted for his strong tackling and aerial ability, Jones attracted the attention of West Bromwich Albion and moved to the Hawthorns in May 1960 for a fee of £7,000, having been central to Walsall's Fourth Division title success in the 1959-60 season.

At Albion Jones displaced Joe Kennedy from the number five shirt, becoming first choice at centre back for much of the 1960s. However he missed the 1966 Football League Cup Final, Albion's only trophy win during his time at the club, due to injury. The following season Jones lost his place in the Albion first team to new signing Eddie Colquhoun and in March 1968 was allowed to leave and return to Walsall.

Jones remained at Fellows Park until 1973 when he returned to Kidderminster as player-manager. He subsequently signed for Hednesford Town as a player before retiring in 1976.

Having retired from playing he remained in the game, coaching at Coleshill Town, Walsall (where he was involved in youth and reserve team matters) and Burton Albion before starting a sports equipment business in Walsall.

References

1938 births
Living people
English footballers
Kidderminster Harriers F.C. players
Walsall F.C. players
West Bromwich Albion F.C. players
Hednesford Town F.C. players
Kidderminster Harriers F.C. managers
English Football League players
Sportspeople from Shropshire
Association football central defenders
English football managers